Mark Weston may refer to:
 Mark Weston (journalist) (born 1953), American journalist, writer, and speaker
 Mark Weston (athlete) (1905–1978), British field athlete
 Mark Weston (Shortland Street)